Innertavle is a locality situated in Umeå Municipality, Västerbotten County, Sweden with 582 inhabitants in 2010.

References 

Populated places in Umeå Municipality